Daniel William Kucera, OSB (Czech pronunciation [kuˈtsera]; May 7, 1923 – May 30, 2017) was a bishop of the Catholic Church. He served as an Auxiliary Bishop in Joliet (1977–1980),  the Bishop of Salina (1980–1983), and as the Archbishop of Dubuque (1983–1995).

Early life and ministry
Kucera was born in a Czech family in Chicago, Illinois, on May 7, 1923, and given the name William. His parents were Joseph F. and Lillian (Petrzelka) Kucera.  
 
Kucera was educated at St. Procopius College (now known as Benedictine University) in Lisle, Illinois. He took the religious name of Daniel when he professed religious vows June 16, 1944, at St. Procopius Abbey in the Order of Saint Benedict. On May 26, 1949, he was ordained a priest. Kucera earned a doctorate in education from The Catholic University of America in 1954. His background in education has led Vatican officials — including the Pope — to ask his advice on educational matters. He served in various administrative positions at St. Procopius College until he was named the college's president. On July 8, 1964, he was elected Abbot of St. Procopius Abbey and received his abbatial blessing on August 19, 1964. He served as abbot until June 1, 1971, when he resigned to become the college's president again.

On June 6, 1977, Pope Paul VI named Kucera Titular Bishop of Natchesium and Auxiliary Bishop of Joliet.  He was consecrated by Bishop Romeo Roy Blanchette of Joliet.  Bishops Andrew Grutka of Gary and Raymond Vonesh, auxiliary bishop of Joliet, served as primary co-consecrators.

Bishop of Salina
On March 5, 1980, Pope John Paul II appointed Kucera as the eighth bishop of Salina, in the state of Kansas. He was formally installed in Sacred Heart Cathedral on May 7, 1980, by Archbishop Ignatius J. Strecker of Kansas City in Kansas. During his three years as bishop of the diocese the Diocesan Office of Planning, the Bishop's Council for Catholic Education and the Office of Youth Ministries were established.  The diocese hired a business manager, and the chancery and other administrative offices of the diocese were moved to a larger building downtown.  Marymount College in Salina became a diocesan institution after the Sisters of St. Joseph of Concordia decided they were no longer able to continue ownership. The college closed in 1989.

Archbishop of Dubuque
On December 20, 1983, Pope John Paul II appointed Kucera as the tenth bishop and eighth archbishop of Dubuque.  He was installed as archbishop on February 23, 1984, at the Five Flags Civic Center in Dubuque.  One of the first decisions he made was to sell the old episcopal residence and move to a more modest house in Dubuque.

Kucera set about reorganizing the archdiocese.  This was accomplished by reorganizing or creating archdiocesan boards, and established the first Archbishop's Cabinet to coordinate the running of the archdiocese. The archdiocese was divided into three regions: Dubuque, Cedar Rapids and Waterloo with a bishop in each region.  The number of deaneries were reduced from 16 to 14.  Kucera appointed  a woman religious chancellor, and two lay people were named to archdiocesan offices.  He also had revised guidelines for the Sacrament of Confirmation published in 1986. On November 30, 1986, Kucera issued a proclamation announcing the 150th anniversary of the archdiocese's founding. Various celebrations were held throughout the following year including a large scale liturgy at the Five Flags Center celebrated by Archbishop Pio Laghi, the Papal Pro-Nuncio to the United States.  He also approved a controversial renovation of St. Raphael's Cathedral.

In 1994, he requested the appointment of a coadjutor. Bishop Jerome Hanus of Saint Cloud was assigned as Coadjutor Archbishop of Dubuque. On October 16, 1995, Pope John Paul II accepted Kucera's resignation, and he was named archbishop emeritus.

Later life and death
By 2013 Kucera had moved back to Dubuque after living in Aurora, Colorado, for a number of years. On May 31, 2017, church officials confirmed that Kucera had died at Stonehill Care Center in Dubuque on May 30, 2017, at the age of 94.  His funeral was held at St. Raphael's Cathedral in Dubuque, and he was interred in the cemetery of St. Procopius Abbey in Lisle.

See also
 

Catholic Church hierarchy
Catholic Church in the United States
Historical list of the Catholic bishops of the United States
List of Catholic bishops of the United States
Lists of patriarchs, archbishops, and bishops

References

Episcopal succession

 

1923 births
2017 deaths
20th-century Roman Catholic archbishops in the United States
Roman Catholic archbishops of Dubuque
American Benedictines
Benedictine abbots
Benedictine bishops
Benedictine University faculty
Catholic University of America alumni
Roman Catholic bishops of Salina
Roman Catholic Diocese of Joliet in Illinois
Religious leaders from Illinois
American people of Czech descent